Marco Giallini (born  4 April 1963) is an Italian actor.

Life and career 
Born in Rome, Giallini is the son of a housewife and a furnace labourer. After attending the Accademia Nazionale di Arte Drammatica Silvio D'Amico, he began acting on stage, working among others with Arnoldo Foà and Angelo Orlando. He made his film debut in 1995, in the Orlando's comedy film L'anno prossimo vado a letto alle dieci. He appeared on several TV-series and was co-protagonist, alongside Valerio Mastandrea, of the Rai Tre sitcom Buttafuori.  He is also very active in music videos and short films.

In 2012 Giallini won the Nastro d'Argento for best supporting actor thanks to his performance in ACAB - All Cops Are Bastards. The same year he won the Ciak d'oro as personality of the year.

Giallini was married to his wife Loredana for 25 years, and they had two children.  He has remained a widower since July 2011, when his wife was struck down by a cerebral hemorrhage.

Selected filmography
 Kaputt Mundi (1998) 
 The Scent of the Night (1998)
 Almost Blue (2000)
 Picasso's Face (2000)
 I Am Emma (2002)
 The Fugitive (2003)
 Don't Move (2004)
 The Vanity Serum (2004)
 Amatemi (2005)
 The Family Friend (2006)
 Il mostro di Firenze (2009)
 Me, Them and Lara (2010)
 The First Beautiful Thing (2010)
 La passione (2010) 
 All at Sea (2011)
 ACAB – All Cops Are Bastards (2012)
 A Flat for Three (2012)
 A Perfect Family (2012)
 Buongiorno papà (2013)
 Tutta colpa di Freud (2014)
 Happily Mixed Up (2014)
 Them Who? (2015)
 God Willing (2015)
 Perfect Strangers (2016)
 Rocco Schiavone TV series (2016-)
 Ignorance Is Bliss (2017)
 The Place (2017)
 Forgive Us Our Debts (2018)
 Io sono Tempesta (2018)
 All You Need Is Crime (2019)
 Domani è un altro giorno (2019)
 Villetta con ospiti (2020)

References

External links 

1963 births
Male actors from Rome
Italian male stage actors
Italian male film actors
Italian male television actors
Living people
Nastro d'Argento winners
Accademia Nazionale di Arte Drammatica Silvio D'Amico alumni